KZOR is a radio station airing a hot adult contemporary format, licensed to Hobbs, New Mexico, broadcasting on 94.1 MHz FM. The station is owned by Noalmark Broadcasting Corporation.

Engineering
Chief Engineer is Kenneth S. Fine, CPBE

References

External links

ZOR
Noalmark Broadcasting Corporation radio stations